, son of Nijō Munemoto, was a Japanese kugyō (court noble) of the Edo period (1603–1868). He had many children with a daughter of the fifth lord of Mito Domain Tokugawa Munemoto. Among them were: (in order of birth)
 
 Kujō Suketsugu
 Saionji 寛季
 Consort of Tokugawa Nariatsu, third head of Hitotsubashi-Tokugawa family
 Nijō Narinobu (who was adopted by his brother Narimichi)
 Kujō Hisatada
 Nijo Suiko, Consort of Nabeshima Naotomo, eighth lord of Hasunoike Domain (subdomain of Saga Domain).
 Consort of Matsudaira Yoritsugu, eighth lord of Hitachi-Fuchū Domain.

Family
Parents
Father: Nijō Munemoto (二条 宗基, June 8, 1727 – February 9, 1754)
Mother: Court Lady (家女房)
Consorts and issues:
Wife: Tokugawa Yoshihime (徳川嘉姫）, daughter of Tokugawa Munemoto
Nijō Narimichi  (二条斉通, 31 Mai 1781 – 4 July 1794), first son
Kujō Suketsugu (九条 輔嗣, 28 October 1784 – 6 March 1807), third son
Nijō Narinobu (二条 斉信, April 10, 1788 – June 9, 1847), sixth son
Concubine: Higuchi Nobuko (樋口信子), daughter of Higuchi Motoyasu (樋口基康)
Kujō Hisatada (九条 尚忠, September 5, 1798 – October 5, 1871), eleventh son
Concubine: Court Lady (家女房)
Saionji Hirouse (西園寺寛季, 23 January 1787 – 18 March 1856), fourth son
Tanemaro (胤麿), fifth son
Zomamoru (増護, d. 1875), sixth son
Michinaga (道永, d.1821), seventh son
Shinkkan (信観), eighth son
Matsudono Takanori (松殿隆温, 1811 – 1875), ninth son
Lady Takako (隆子), Wife of Tokugawa Harukuni (徳川 治国), first daughter
Lady Tsunehime (恒姫), second daughter
Lady Oyako (親子), third daughter
Lady Yasuko (保子), Wife of Tokugawa Nariatsu (徳川 斉敦), fourth daughter
Lady Ueko (嬉子)  fifth daughter
Lady Kyoko (軌子), Wife of Hanazono Kohei (花園公熙), sixth daughter
Lady Fukuko (福子), Wife of Kuroda  Narikiyo (黒田 斉清), seventh daughter
Lady Takiko (多喜子), eighth daughter
Lady Takeko (武子), Eife of Otose Shigenobu (乙瀬重信), ninth daughter
Lady Hiroko (広子), tenth daughter
Lady Ikuko (育子), eleventh daughter
Lady Jūko (柔子), Wife of Echizen Seiteru (越前誠照), twelfth daughter
Lady Chikako (近子, 1804 – 1849), thirteenth daughter
Lady Junhine (純姫), fourteenth daughter
Nijo Suiko (二条 遂子), Wife of Nabeshima Naotomo (鍋島 直与), fifteenth daughter 
Lady Saiko (最子), Wife of Matsudaira Yoritsuna ( 松平頼縄), sixteenth daughter
Lady Tsuneko (常子), seventeenth daughter

Ancestry

References

 

1754 births
1826 deaths
Fujiwara clan
Harutaka